Virtuální is the fifth studio album by the Polish pop rock singer Ewa Farna, released on 26 October 2009. This album has Czech lyrics, and its songs have a pop rock style with electronic mixes. One song on this album was composed by Farna, with assistance of producer Jan Steinsdörfer.

This album in 2010 had a Polish version, EWAkuacja. Some songs on EWAkuacja, however, are completely different, such as "Touzim" (for "Ewakuacja"), "Virtualni" ("Zwiode cie"), "Jen tak" ("Bez lez"), "Maska" ("Maska"), "Ty jsi kral" ("Krol to ty") and  "Dest" ("Deszcz"). "Obrazova vila" has a Polish version, but it came out in 2011 on Ewa Farna-Live (Niezapomniany koncert urodzinowy).

"Jen Tak" was later sung by the American Idol contestant Kimberly Caldwell under its English title, "Going Going Gone", for her first album Without Regret. "Kdo dá víc" was recorded in 2010 by Miley Cyrus as "Kiss It Goodbye", for the album Hannah Montana Forever. However, these two artists did not cover Farna, because the songs are in the database of Universal Music.

Track listing

References

External links
 

Ewa Farna albums
2009 albums